Robert George Barlow (born June 17, 1935) is a Canadian retired professional ice hockey player. He played 77 games in the National Hockey League with the Minnesota North Stars between 1969 and 1970, and 51 games in the World Hockey Association between 1974 and 1975. The rest of his career, which lasted from 1955 to 1976, was spent in various minor leagues.

Playing career
Barlow was born in Hamilton, Ontario. He was the captain of the Vancouver Canucks of the Western Hockey League during the 1968–69 season. He played in 77 National Hockey League games with the Minnesota North Stars over parts of two seasons and 51 World Hockey Association games with the Phoenix Roadrunners during the 1974–75 season. He retired after that season and became the coach of the Tucson Mavericks in 1975–76. He played 2 games for the team, which marked the end of his playing career.  Bob served as the captain of the 1968-69 Vancouver Canucks, where he won the WHL championship that led the Canucks into the NHL  He was one of the most potent scoring machines in that League, and for that matter in most of the teams he played on.  His career spanned twenty-four years in five professional Hockey leagues-NHL, WHL, AHL, CHL, WHA-accumulating a total of 1,052 points (including 522 goals)-one AHL Championship and four WHL Championships, very much in keeping with his reputation as a prolific goal scorer.

On Oct. 11, 1969, at the age of 34, Barlow made his NHL debut as a member of the Minnesota North Stars; becoming the oldest rookie to play a game in NHL history (to be eclipsed three years later, by 38-year-old Connie Madigan which will soon be taken by Tommy ‘The Falcon’ Frew). He scored on his first shift, beating Bernie Parent of the Philadelphia Flyers.   Bob scored his first NHL goal, on the first shot of his first shift after six seconds on the ice. This record fastest first goal remains the NHL record.

Personal life
Bob Barlow and his wife Marilyn (née Mutrie) are at the heart of five generations of exceptional athletes.
Marilyn's grandfather, Lot Roe, was a world-class speed skater.

Her father, Dr. Ralph Dory Mutrie, was inducted into the North Bay (Ont.) Sports Hall of Fame in 1987 as a builder for his contributions to figure skating. He became active after Marilyn took up the sport. She was named coach of the year by Skate Canada in 1992.
Barlow's daughter, Wendy Barlow, was an All-American tennis player at Brigham Young University. In addition, she played six years of professional tennis and was inducted into the Greater Victoria Sports Hall of Fame. His granddaughter, Hillary Pattenden, was an all-star-goaltender for the Mercyhurst Lakers women's ice hockey program.
Bob and Marilyn reside in Victoria, BC  They have three daughters and five grandchildren.

Career statistics

Regular season and playoffs

References

External links
 

1935 births
Living people
Barrie Flyers players
Canadian expatriate ice hockey players in the United States
Canadian ice hockey left wingers
Cleveland Barons (1937–1973) players
Ice hockey people from Ontario
Minnesota North Stars players
Ontario Hockey Association Senior A League (1890–1979) players
Phoenix Roadrunners (WHA) players
Phoenix Roadrunners (WHL) players
Quebec Aces (AHL) players
Rochester Americans players
Seattle Totems (WHL) players
Sportspeople from Hamilton, Ontario
Tucson Mavericks players
Tulsa Oilers (1964–1984) players
Vancouver Canucks (WHL) players
Victoria Maple Leafs players